Ashley Rae Phillips (born February 21, 1986) is an American soccer coach and former goalkeeper from Peabody, Massachusetts.

Career

Coaching career
Phillips, born in Beverly, Massachusetts, is an American Woman's soccer coach. In 2010 Phillips became an assistant couch for Northeastern University soccer. In 2013 Phillips also became an assistant coach for the 2014 Boston Breakers. In 2016 Phillips was named head coach for Northeastern University.

Professional career
Phillips, was an American soccer goalkeeper for the 2009, 2010, and 2011 Boston Breakers, the Boston team of the Women's Professional Soccer  and National Women's Soccer League.
Phillips was a developmental player for the 2009 Boston Breakers, and the starting goalkeeper at the beginning of the 2010 and 2013 seasons.

College career
Phillips was a four-year starter at Clemson University.  In her 2007 senior year, Phillips was named to the 2007 All-ACC First Team] and the 2007 Herman Trophy Watch List. Phillips holds the Clemson record for career saves of 336. In her 2006 junior year, Phillips lead Clemson to the Elite Eight of the NCAA tournament, advancing in each of the three rounds on penalty kicks, a first for both women's and men's NCAA soccer. 

Phillips was named to the 2006 NSCAA All America Third Team and the All-ACC Second Team. In her 2005 sophomore year Phillips was named to the SoccerBuzz Southeast region First Team and the All-ACC Second Team. In her 2004 freshmen year underdog Clemson won their first two games of the season against Texas and Texas A&M earning Phillips a place on both the SoccerAmerica and SoccerBuzz Team of the Week.

Youth National Team Career
U16 WNT, U17 WNT, U19 WNT, U21 WNT

Club career
 Boston Breakers (WPS)
 Atlanta Silverbacks (W-League)
 Boston Renegades (W-League)
 Spirit of Massachusetts (MA Premier League)
 Northeast Futbol Club (MA Premier League)

High school career
 Milton Academy
 Bishop Fenwick High School

References

Boston Breakers players
1986 births
Living people
Clemson Tigers women's soccer players
American women's soccer players
American women's soccer coaches
Women's association football goalkeepers
National Women's Soccer League players
Northeastern Huskies women's soccer coaches
Atlanta Silverbacks Women players
Soccer players from Massachusetts
Boston Aztec (WPSL) players
Milton Academy alumni
Bishop Fenwick High School (Peabody, Massachusetts) alumni
Women's Professional Soccer players
Boston Breakers non-playing staff
USL W-League (1995–2015) players
Boston Renegades players